Gazprom-Ugra Yugorsk is a futsal club based in Yugorsk, Russia. It was founded in 1992. Today Ugra Yugorsk is competing in the Russian Super League. In the 2014/2015 season, Yugra won its first trophy there. A season later they won the UEFA Futsal Cup, defeating Inter Movistar in the final. The club is owned by Russian state-controlled energy company Gazprom.

Titles
UEFA Futsal Cup: 2015/16
Russian Championship:
Gold (3): 2014/15, 2017/18, 2021/22
Silver (5): 2007/08, 2012/13, 2013/14, 2015/16, 2019/20
Bronze (7): 1995/96, 1996/97, 2000/01, 2006/07, 2008/09, 2011/12, 2016/17 
Russian Cup (5): 2011/12, 2015/16, 2017/18, 2018/19, 2020/21
 Russian Super Cup: 2022
Urals Cup (2): 2001, 2007
European Futsal Cup Winners Cup: 2012

Season to season

Current squad

Notable players

References

External links
 Official Website
 UEFA club profile
 Footballzz.co.uk club profile

Futsal clubs in Russia
Futsal clubs established in 1992